Charcoal Chefs is a Canadian cooking television series which aired on CBC Television from 1976 to 1978.

Premise
George Knight and Fernie Kirouac hosted this Winnipeg-produced series in which they demonstrated barbecue cooking on location at St. Vital Park.

Scheduling
This half-hour series was broadcast on Sundays at 9:00 a.m. (Eastern) for three seasons: 4 July to 19 September 1976, 21 August to 25 September 1977 and 3 June to 12 August 1978.

References

External links
 

CBC Television original programming
1976 Canadian television series debuts
1978 Canadian television series endings
Television shows filmed in Winnipeg